Diacope is a rhetorical term meaning repetition of a word or phrase that is broken up by a single intervening word, or a small number of intervening words. It derives from a Greek word diakopḗ, which means "cut in two".

Examples
 "Bond. James Bond." — James Bond
 "Put out the light, and then put out the light." — Shakespeare, Othello, Act V, scene 2.
 "A horse! a horse! my kingdom for a horse! — Richard III
 "You think you own whatever land you land on" —  Second verse from the song "Colors of the Wind" from the movie Pocahontas
 Leo Marks's poem "The Life That I Have", memorably used in the film Odette, is an extended example of diacope:
 The life that I have
 Is all that I have
 And the life that I have
 Is yours.

 The love that I have
 Of the life that I have
 Is yours and yours and yours.
 
 A sleep I shall have
 A rest I shall have
 Yet death will be but a pause.
 
 For the peace of my years
 In the long green grass
 Will be yours and yours and yours.

The first line in the poem not to deploy diacope is the one about death being "a pause."

 "In times like these, it helps to recall that there have always been times like these." — Paul Harvey. This is also an example of an epanalepsis.

See also
 Epizeuxis
 Tmesis

References

Figures of speech
Rhetoric